The 39th UIT World Shooting Championships was the contemporary name of the ISSF World Shooting Championships in all ISSF shooting events that were held in Wiesbaden, West Germany in 1966.

Medal count

Rifle events

Men

Women

Pistol events

Men

Women

Shotgun events

Men

Women

Running target events

References

ISSF World Shooting Championships
Shooting
1966 in West German sport
Sport in Wiesbaden
Shooting competitions in Germany
International sports competitions hosted by West Germany
1960s in Hesse